Friedrich Hartmann Graf (23 August 1727 – 19 August 1795) was a German flautist and composer.

Biography
Graf was born on 23 August 1727 in Rudolstadt. He was trained by his father Johann Graf and then served as a drummer in a Dutch army regiment where he was taken as a prisoner of war by the English. After he returned in 1759 he became a flautist and conductor in Hamburg for five years. During that time he toured England, the Dutch Republic, Italy, Switzerland and Germany. He was then made first flautist by his brother Christian Ernst Graf who led the chapel of the stadtholder's court in The Hague. Later he became the music director of all Protestant churches, and cantor of the school of St. Anna in Augsburg where he founded a civil society concert in 1779. Here he also met Mozart.

Graf died on 19 August 1795 in Augsburg.

1727 births
1795 deaths
German Classical-period composers
German classical flautists
18th-century classical composers
German male classical composers
18th-century German composers
18th-century German male musicians